Generally, the Chicago Harbor comprises the public rivers, canals, and lakes within the territorial limits of the City of Chicago and all connecting slips, basins, piers, breakwaters, and permanent structures therein for a distance of three miles from the shore between the extended north and south lines of the city. The greater Chicago Harbor includes portions of the Chicago River, the Calumet River, the Ogden Canal, the Chicago Sanitary and Ship Canal, Lake Calumet, and Lake Michigan.

In a more narrow sense, the Chicago Harbor is that artificial harbor on Lake Michigan located at the mouth of the Chicago River bounded by outer breakwaters to the north and east, Northerly Island to the south, and the Chicago shoreline to the west.  The main entrance to this harbor is marked by the Chicago Harbor Lighthouse.  The Jardine Water Purification Plant, Navy Pier, the Chicago Harbor Lock, Coast Guard Station Chicago, the municipal harbors - Dusable Harbor and Monroe Harbor, and the yacht clubs - Chicago Yacht Club and Columbia Yacht Club are all located here.

The Port of Chicago is located within the greater Chicago Harbor in and around Calumet Harbor, the Calumet River, and Lake Calumet.

The Chicago Park District operates a municipal harbor system within the greater Chicago Harbor in Lake Michigan for recreational boaters.  With accommodations for 6000 boats, it is the largest system of its kind in the nation.  The system comprises (from north to south) Montrose Harbor, Belmont Harbor, Diversey Harbor, Dusable Harbor, Monroe Harbor, Burnham Harbor, 31st Street Harbor, 59th Street Harbor, and Jackson Park Inner and Outer Harbors.

See also
 Chicago Area Waterway System
 Port of Chicago

References

Ports and harbors of Illinois
Transportation in Chicago
Geography of Chicago